Great White North Records was a Canadian independent record label founded in 1999 and dissolved in 2006.  It was founded by Rémi Côté and Stéphane Bélanger and focused on promoting metal.  Though the label released music by bands from around the world, it was a notable outlet and supporter of Canadian metal.

History
Over the course of its existence GWN had a European outlet in the Netherlands (Great White North Records Europe) which manufactured select GWN releases for its own market, a French distribution office (GWN Records France) and spawned two sub-labels: Grind It! Records (for grindcore and crust) and Demÿsteriis (for black metal and other dark music).  Productions Nouvelle France was also started with partner's in France, specializing in French rock and punk.  In late 2003 the European outlet separated from the Canadian branch due to "differences in company politics."

On December 3, 2003  Rémi and Stéphane opened a record store in Montreal called Profusion: Le Metal Store.  The record label operations were run out of the same offices.  In March 2006, Rémi Côté decided to leave Great White North Records to "concentrate on [his] store, [his] traveling addiction and various new projects."  That July, only a few months later, Great White North closed.  Côté went on to start Prodisk, which continues to release Canadian metal.

Discography

GWN releases

Canceled releases
These releases were slated for release in 2006, however, they never materialized before the label dissolved.

Grind It! releases

Demÿsteriis  Releases

External links
Interview with owners
Info for Prodisk
Interview

References

Record labels established in 1999
Record labels disestablished in 2006
Canadian independent record labels
Quebec record labels
Heavy metal record labels
Defunct record labels of Canada
Sainte-Julie, Quebec
1999 establishments in Canada